The Kallang Ground is a cricket ground in Kallang, Singapore. The ground played host to nine One-Day Internationals in 1999 and 2000, and is a regular home ground for the Singapore national cricket team. It also hosted matches in the 1999 Youth Asia Cup, the Tuanku Ja'afar Cup in 2000 and 2004, and the 2002 ACC Trophy.

References

Kallang
Cricket grounds in Singapore